Concept 1 was a series of 12" records released by Richie Hawtin (aka Plastikman) in 1996. Each month 1 track was released on 12" and only 2000 records of each monthly record was released. In 2022, all the tracks were released as an album digitally.

Background 
In 1995, Richie Hawtin decided to change styles from his usual Acid Techno sound, that revolved around the use of synthesizer TB-303 and drum machine TR-909. Loaded with new modular synthesizers by Doepfer, he started producing minimal techno tracks. Starting in 1996, each month he released 2000 copies of one track on 12" vinyl. A subscription plan was also offered. Technically he was his own record distributor.

The tracks were receded at a time when Hawtin was kicked out of the USA. Hawtin who is a Canada native, typically spun records at Detroit, across the border. The concept of these recordings kick started the next Plastikman album called Consumed, which was a huge success.

The tracks were reissued in 2007 as a double-CD set, but they were never available digitally until 2021.

In January 2021, 25 years after the records were first released, Hawtin announced the release of all the Concept 1 tracks digitally, as an album. The album became available on Bandcamp.

Reception 
AllMusic gave it a 4.5 star rating.

References 

Richie Hawtin albums
1996 albums